Ilia Giorgadze (born 12 January 1978) is a Georgian artistic gymnast that has represented Georgia at the 1996, 2000, 2004 and 2008 Summer Olympics.

References

External links
 

1978 births
Living people
Male artistic gymnasts from Georgia (country)
Olympic gymnasts of Georgia (country)
Gymnasts at the 1996 Summer Olympics
Gymnasts at the 2000 Summer Olympics
Gymnasts at the 2004 Summer Olympics
Gymnasts at the 2008 Summer Olympics
People from Kutaisi
20th-century people from Georgia (country)
21st-century people from Georgia (country)